Making News is a television drama set in the world of journalism produced by Thames Television for the ITV network.

A pilot episode, entitled 'Making News', was screened on 9 May 1989 as part of Thames' anthology series Storyboard. The pilot was developed into a series of  six episodes transmitted the following year.

Cast

Clive Arrindell – Alex Hendry
Tom Cotcher – Eddie Fraser
Bill Nighy – Sam Courtney
Gawn Grainger – Pelham Beecher
Paul Darrow – George Parnell
Nichola McAuliffe – Carrie Vernon
Annie Lambert – Jill Wycombe
Alphonsia Emmanuel – Anita Markham
Tony Osoba – Freddie
Ian Bleasdale – Ron
Charlotte Attenborough – Lucy Trent

Episode list

External links
 

ITV television dramas
1990 British television series debuts
1990 British television series endings
1990s British drama television series
Television series about journalism
Television shows produced by Thames Television
English-language television shows